The Greater Dublin Area (GDA; Irish: Mórcheantar Bhaile Átha Cliath), or simply Greater Dublin, is an informal term that is taken to include the city of Dublin and its hinterland, with varying definitions as to its extent. At the expansive end, it has been defined as including all of the traditional County Dublin and three neighbouring counties, while more commonly it is taken as the contiguous metropolitan area of Dublin plus suburban and commuter towns. The area is defined for strategic planning, and, for example, transport, and it is not a formal administrative or political unit.

Definitions

Planning usage
The 2003 Regional Planning Guidelines referred to the Greater Dublin Area as a planning district separated into a "metropolitan area" and a "hinterland area".

The "metropolitan area" included both suburbs and commuter towns, covering the area from Swords and Malahide in Fingal, to Greystones in County Wicklow in the south, and as far west as Kilcock in County Kildare. This area differs from the Garda "metropolitan region" scope, in that it stretches approximately 20 km further west.

The Dublin Metropolitan Area is now defined as:

The Dublin "Hinterland" area is aligned with the Draft National Planning Framework, which defines city regions or urban hinterlands as those EDs where at least 15% of the workforce (Full POWCAR) are employed in the Dublin Metropolitan Area (NTA boundary).

Dublin Transport Authority
At the broader end of definitions, the Dublin Transport Authority Act 2008 defines the Greater Dublin Area as including the counties of Dublin (Dublin City, South Dublin, Dún Laoghaire–Rathdown and Fingal), Meath, Kildare, and Wicklow; as of 2022, its estimated population is 2,073,459.

Former boundaries
The urban part of Dublin and surrounding areas has been defined by various statutory instruments, mainly those referring to the Garda Síochána and Courts of the Republic of Ireland. The city, three other counties within the traditional County Dublin, and three neighbouring counties, were grouped together in the order creating the Dublin Transportation Office, giving functions and representations to the office in this area, although not using the term. The office was purely advisory and had no executive powers. The term was later defined in section 3 of the Dublin Transport Authority Act 2008. On 1 December 2009 the DTO became the National Transport Authority, with a remit expanding beyond the Greater Dublin Area.

Garda usage
The Garda used the term the Dublin Metropolitan Region (DMR) which was formerly the jurisdiction, within the eastern part of Ireland, of the Dublin Metropolitan Police, which was subsequently merged into the Garda Síochána, the national police force of Ireland. The term originated from the Police Forces Amalgamation Act 1925, which amalgamated the Dublin Metropolitan Police and Garda Síochána as one national police force.

This jurisdiction covered parts of the old County Dublin (except the northern part around Swords) as well as the County Kildare town of Leixlip and the County Wicklow towns of Bray, Greystones and Enniskerry. Swords was covered by the Meath Garda Division. In this way, it differed from the usual definition of County Dublin and did not even conform to the looser definition of the Greater Dublin Area.

The definition no longer applies, as during 2008 the Garda divisions were realigned along Regional and county boundaries. As of 2009, the Dublin Metropolitan Region is co-extensive with the combined area of the city of Dublin, and the counties of Dún Laoghaire–Rathdown, Fingal and South Dublin. Leixlip was moved to the County Kildare Division and became the district headquarters for the new Leixlip District. Bray moved into the new County Wicklow Division and became district headquarters for the Bray District.

Population
 The population of the Dublin City and County (Dublin City, Fingal, South Dublin and Dún Laoghaire–Rathdown) and Outer Greater Dublin (Meath, Kildare and Wicklow) as of the 2022 census was 2,073,459 persons. This equates to 40.5% of Ireland's population. Estimates published by the Central Statistics Office suggest that the population will reach 2.4 million by 2026. The figures are based on a regional breakdown of previously published national population projections and assume that current demographic trends will continue.

The CSO also uses the narrower definition which comprises Dublin City and its suburbs within the 3 local Dublin authorities.
 The boundaries for suburbs are not legally defined, but drawn and revised by the CSO in accordance with United Nations recommendations. The population distribution of the Greater Dublin Area as of the 2011, 2016 and 2022 censuses was as follows:

Historical

Gallery

See also 
 Belfast metropolitan area
 Derry Urban Area
 List of metropolitan areas in Europe

References

External links
 Eastern and Midland Regional Assembly
 Dublin Regional Authority
 Greater Dublin population to reach two million, from RTÉ News
 Regional Planning Guidelines for the Greater Dublin Area
 Cities/Towns Boundaries CSO page with links to Shapefile data for the boundary of the CSO-defined Greater Dublin Area; readable by Geographic information systems

Dublin
Leinster